Benjamin Moses Teal (January 19, 1857 – April 20, 1917) was an American actor, theater director, and playwright. He directed over 30 plays on Broadway between 1897 and 1916, and was widely known for his strict, often brusque stage direction. Born in Eugene, Oregon, Teal spent his formative years in San Francisco, where he began performing as a child actor in theatrical productions.

As an adult, Teal began his career as a stage director in San Francisco before relocating to New York City in the latter part of the nineteenth century. Among his directorial credits include the original Broadway production of Ben-Hur (1899), in which he staged the play's elaborate chariot race sequence onstage.

Life and career
Teal was born January 19, 1857, in Eugene, Oregon. He spent his early life in San Francisco, and made his first stage appearance at four or five years old. As an adult, Teal began his career as a stage director in California, before relocating to New York City in the latter part of the century.

He married Mary Blackburn, a native of Sacramento, California, in New York City on June 27, 1887. He later remarried to Portland, Oregon, native Elinor Toomey Gilman in Boston, Massachusetts, on October 9, 1906.

Teal gained notoriety for his directing of the original Broadway production of Ben-Hur (1899–1900), in which he successfully arranged an elaborate chariot race sequence on stage. He staged over thirty plays on Broadway between 1897 and 1916. Teal was known for his brusque stage direction and interaction with cast members, though he was noted for being "without peer in his ability to move large numbers of extras around onstage." Writer Edward Jewett Luce noted in 1910: "Ben Teal—the very mention of whose name suggest stage management with a vengeance—is known all over the world as the strictest, yet the most conscientious of stage directors."

Death
Teal died in a New York City sanitarium of an unspecified disease on April 20, 1917. He is interred in Woodlawn Cemetery in the Bronx.

Stage credits

Notes

References

Sources

Further reading

External links

1857 births
1917 deaths
American male child actors
American male stage actors
American musical theatre directors
American theatre directors
Burials at Woodlawn Cemetery (Bronx, New York)
Male actors from Eugene, Oregon
Writers from Eugene, Oregon
Writers from San Francisco